Royal Odyssey may refer to the following cruise ships:

 , in service with Royal Cruise Line 1981–1988
 , in service with Royal Cruise Line 1991–1997

Ship names